Hillbilly Deluxe may refer to:
 Hillbilly Deluxe (Dwight Yoakam album), released in 1987
 Hillbilly Deluxe (Brooks & Dunn album), released in 2005
"Hillbilly Deluxe" (song), a single from this album

See also
Hellbilly Deluxe, a 1998 album by Rob Zombie